Ailton Silva may refer to:

Ailton dos Santos Silva (born 1966), Brazilian football manager
Ailton Ferreira Silva (born 1995), Brazilian footballer